

Introduction 
The Ministry of Justice of Curaçao is "responsible for the legal order, law enforcement, security and public order within the country of Curaçao." The ministry primarily focuses on the following:

 Developing policies
 Overseeing judicial legislation
 Contributing to the functional quality of its partners in safety care; 
 Ensuring the safety, order and peace in the Curaçao society, its citizens, and its visitors

List of ministers (Post-2010 upon establishing autonomy) 

 Elmer Wilsoe (2010-2012)
 Nelson Navarro (2012-2016)
 Ornelio Martina (2016-2017)
 Gilmar Pisas (2017)
 Quincy Girigorie (2017-present)

See also 

 Justice ministry
 List of cabinets of Curaçao
 Politics of Curaçao

References 

Justice ministries
Government of Curaçao